Sir Denis Hubert Fletcher Rickett,  (27 July 1907 – 26 February 1997), was a British civil servant who served as Clement Attlee's Principal Private Secretary (PPS) from 1950 to 1951 and as vice-president of the World Bank from 1968 until 1974.

Early life 

Denis Hubert Fletcher Rickett was born on 27 July 1907, to the family of the owners of the coal merchants firm of Rickett & Cockerell, which through mergers and acquisitions became the eventual owners of the Falkland Islands Company. After studying at Rugby School he matriculated to Balliol College, Oxford graduating in 1929. Although he went on to win a prize fellowship to All Souls College, Oxford he chose to leave academia and instead join the civil service.

Career 
Sir Denis Rickett's career began at the Economic Advisory Council in 1931. He rose through the ranks to become Clement Attlee's Principal Private Secretary during 1950–1951. After various roles in the Treasury and Whitehall, he left to become vice-president of the International Bank for Reconstruction and Development in Washington, then under the leadership of Robert McNamara, a position he enjoyed from 1968 to 1974. 

Rickett was appointed Companion of the Order of St Michael and St George (CMG) in the 1947 King's Birthday Honours, Companion of the Order of the Bath (CB) in the 1951 Prime Minister's Resignation Honours and knighted (KCMG) in the Queen's Birthday Honours 1956.

Personal life 

Denis Rickett was personally wealthy owning his own Rolls-Royce. He was also a talented amateur pianist. In 1946 Sir Denis married Ruth Armstrong, a doctor. He had three children, two sons and a daughter.

References 

British civil servants

1907 births
1997 deaths